Sørlandet Hospital Flekkefjord  is a local hospital in Flekkefjord in the far West of Vest-Agder County in Norway. It is one of the three main hospitals in southern Norway.

Today' the hospital is embodied as a department within the Hospital of Southern Norway (Hospital Trust).

The hospital has its own natal department, and a department for emergency surgical and medical procedure.

There is also a psychiatric department for day time treatment at the Regional Psychiatric Centre (DPS) Lister,  and separate department for child- and adolescent psychiatry. (BUP).

The hospital has its own ambulance station.

External links
Official pages 

Flekkefjord
Hospitals in Norway